Dispicable EP is the debut EP by American EDM and hip hop project LA Party Machine (rapper-singer Snoop Dogg and rapper-record producer Daz Dillinger). The EP was released on June 2, 2015, via the iTunes Store and Apple Music.

Production
Production for the album took place during 2014 to 2015 at several recording studios.

Track listing

Release history

References

2015 debut EPs
Snoop Dogg albums
Daz Dillinger albums
Albums produced by Daz Dillinger
EPs by American artists